Anton Ari Einarsson (born 25 August 1994) is an Icelandic football goalkeeper who plays for Breiðablik of the Icelandic Úrvalsdeild.

Club career 
Anton began his career with Afturelding, but he had a short loan spell with Fourth division side Hvíti riddarinn before he made his Afturelding debut. In 2014, he signed for Úrvalsdeild side Valur. Anton had loan spells at Tindastóll and Grindavík before breaking in as the first-choice keeper for Valur.

International career 
In 2017, Anton was called up to play for Iceland's national football team for a friendly match against Mexico. He made his full debut coming on as a half-time substitute in Iceland's 6–0 win over Indonesia Selection in a friendly.

Honours 

Valur

 Icelandic Championships (1): 2017
 Icelandic Cups (2): 2015, 2016
 Icelandic League Cups (1): 2018

References

External links 

 
 EuroSport Profile
 Elite Football profile
 Who Scored.com profile
 
 

1994 births
Living people
Anton Ari Einarsson
Anton Ari Einarsson
Association football midfielders
Anton Ari Einarsson
Anton Ari Einarsson
Anton Ari Einarsson
Anton Ari Einarsson